"Buckaroo" is a 1965 instrumental country single by Buck Owens & The Buckaroos.  The single was Buck Owens' fourth No. 1 on the country chart in less than a year.  "Buckaroo" spent 16 weeks on the chart.  The B-side, entitled "If You Want A Love", peaked at No. 24 on the country chart weeks later.

To date, it is the last instrumental to top the Hot Country Songs chart.

"Buckaroo" was also performed live by The Byrds, and a version can be heard on their album Live at the Fillmore - February 1969.

In 2006, the piece was featured in the movie Idiocracy and later covered by Leo Kottke.

Chart performance

References

Buck Owens songs
1965 singles
1960s instrumentals
Song recordings produced by Ken Nelson (American record producer)
Capitol Records singles
1965 songs